"Made for You" is a song recorded by American country music singer Jake Owen. It is the fourth single from his sixth studio album Greetings from... Jake.

Content
Before releasing the song to radio, Owen performed it at the wedding of country music singers Michael Ray and Carly Pearce on October 6, 2019. Owen had been given the song by a promoter. Songwriter Benjy Davis came up with the song's "descending guitar melody" in May 2017 and presented the idea to co-writers Joey Hyde and Neil Medley during a songwriting session that same month. The lyrics consist mainly of various thematically-related items that are "made for" each other.

"Made for You" was released to radio on May 17, 2020, one day after Owen performed the song on The Bachelorette.

Music video
Owen filmed a music video for the song, which stars his girlfriend, Erica Hartlein, along with his two daughters.

Critical reception
Zackary Kephart of Country Universe rated the song "C+", praising the instrumentation and Owen's voice, but criticizing the lyrics as "cliché".

Controversy 
On July 27, 2021, the song became the subject of a lawsuit by country artists Alexander Cardinale and Morgan Evans, who accused Owen of copyright infringement by lifting the lyrics and melody directly from their 2014 song (2016 single) of the same name. Owen has not publicly commented on the lawsuit.

Charts

Weekly charts

Year-end charts

Certifications

References

2020 songs
2020 singles
Jake Owen songs
Big Loud singles
Song recordings produced by Joey Moi